Snelling & Hoyt and Snelling & Nebraska are a pair of bus rapid transit stations on the A Line in Falcon Heights and Saint Paul, Minnesota. The two stations collectively make up one station, Snelling & Hoyt-Nebraska.

The southbound station, Snelling & Hoyt, is located south of Hoyt Avenue on Snelling Avenue. The northbound station, Snelling & Nebraska, is located south of Nebraska Avenue on Snelling Avenue. The station is split due to right-of-way restrictions on the west side of Snelling Avenue at Nebraska Avenue.

The station opened June 11, 2016 with the rest of the A Line.

Bus connections
This station does not have any bus connections. Route 84, predecessor to the A Line, stopped only at Snelling & Nebraska until December 1, 2018.

Notable places nearby
Minnesota State Fair
Hubert H. Humphrey Job Corps Center
Como neighborhood, Saint Paul

References

External links 
 Metro Transit: Snelling & Hoyt-Nebraska Station

Bus stations in Minnesota